Gwehelog is a village settlement in the community of Llanarth, in Monmouthshire, south east Wales.

Location

History and amenities
There is a Methodist chapel nearby. It was built in 1822, in the Simple Gothic and later Vernacular style of the long-wall entry type. It was modified in 1902. The minister is Rev Ruth Lownsbrough.

A local pub and restaurant is the Hall Inn.

In May 2020 a 57-year-old man died after being attacked by a water buffalo at a farm in Gwehelog. A 19-year-old man was also airlifted to hospital and was in a critical condition at Cardiff's University Hospital of Wales. A 22-year-old woman suffered leg injuries. The animal was destroyed after Gwent Police were called to the farm.

References

External links
 Local walks
 The Hall Inn's website

Villages in Monmouthshire